is a passenger railway station located in the city of Tamano, Okayama Prefecture, Japan, operated by the West Japan Railway Company (JR West).

Lines

Station layout
The station consists of two ground-level opposed side platforms, with one entrance/exit near the center of each platform. The platforms are connected by a footbridge. There is no station building and the station is unattended.

Platforms

Adjacent stations

History
Hachihama Station was opened on 12 June 1910.  With the privatization of Japanese National Railways (JNR) on 1 April 1987, the station came under the control of JR West.

Passenger statistics
In fiscal 2019, the station was used by an average of 419 passengers daily

Surrounding area
Okayama Prefectural Tamano Konan High School
Tamano City Osaki Elementary School

See also
List of railway stations in Japan

References

External links

 JR West Station Official Site

Railway stations in Okayama Prefecture
Uno Line
Railway stations in Japan opened in 1910
Tamano, Okayama